Keith Glasgow (26 January 1949 – 17 September 1999) was a Guyanese cricketer. He played in twelve first-class and two List A matches for Guyana from 1970 to 1977.

See also
 List of Guyanese representative cricketers

References

External links
 

1949 births
1999 deaths
Guyanese cricketers
Guyana cricketers